Dr. Livingstone, I presume may refer to:

 Dr. Livingstone, I presume?, a famous greeting of Henry Morton Stanley upon locating David Livingstone in Africa
 "Dr. Livingstone, I Presume" (song), a song by The Moody Blues
 "Dr. Livingstone (I Presume)", a song by The Tangent from the 2017 album The Slow Rust of Forgotten Machinery
 "Dr. Livingstone (I Presume)", a song by System 7 from the 1994 album Point 3
 Livingstone, supongo, a 1986 game about African exploration by Opera Soft